The Coopers' Federation of Great Britain was a trade union representing coopers in the United Kingdom and, initially, also in Ireland.

The union was founded in 1926 as the Coopers' Federation of Great Britain and Ireland.  It brought together five unions which retained a high level of independence:

With the long-term decline of the industry, its affiliates gradually merged.  In 1970, the Amalgamated and the National merged and became an integral part of the union, leaving only the Manchester Coopers as an affiliate.

Membership of the union was more than 10,000 in the 1950s, but declined to only 1,000 in 1979.  In 1978, the union renamed itself as the Coopers' and Allied Workers' Federation of Great Britain in an attempt to reposition itself, but it decided instead to merge into the National Union of General and Municipal Workers in 1979.

General Secretaries
1926: George William Harrison
1927: R. W. Mann
1942: J. S. Wilkie
1948: Ted Pettengell
1970s: W. Marshall

References

1926 establishments in the United Kingdom
1979 disestablishments in the United Kingdom
Coopers' trade unions
Trade unions established in 1926
Defunct trade unions of the United Kingdom
GMB (trade union) amalgamations
Trade unions based in London